Bittersweet Motel is a 2000 documentary about the rock band Phish. The film was directed by Todd Phillips and covers the band's summer and fall 1997 tours, plus footage from their 1998 summer tour of Europe. The documentary ends with The Great Went, a giant two-day festival held in upstate Maine which attracted 70,000 people.

The film's title comes from a Phish song of the same name, which is featured at the end of the movie.

Songs
Most songs that appear in the film were performed live unless noted.  Eight cover songs are featured in the film, including the rehearsal and debut of Ween's "Roses Are Free" from their Chocolate and Cheese album.  Two other notable debuts captured in the film are an early version of "Sleep" (played solo by Trey on his Languedoc guitar for the cameras which would later appear on their 2000 album Farmhouse) and a soundcheck of the band performing what was at the time the new faster arpeggiated version of "Water in the Sky" that would be seen later that year in studio form on their 1998 album The Story of the Ghost.

The song list does not follow the order in which the scenes were shot. "The Great Went" appears as the climax of the film, though in reality it was the first footage that Phillips shot for the movie.

Additional off stage performances include:

Brian and Robert (rehearsal and performance)
July 2, 1998 - The Grey Hall, Freetown Christiana, Copenhagen, Denmark

Birds of a Feather (rehearsal)
March 1998 - Unknown House, Burlington VT

Sleep 
March 1998?- Trey's Barn, VT

Love Me (Leiber and Stoller) (backstage rehearsal Mike and Trey)
December 31, 1997 - Madison Square Garden, New York NY

Bittersweet Motel (backstage - Trey, Page, & Tom Marshall)
July 8, 1998 - Zeleste, Barcelona, Spain

The following performances were not featured in the film but were included as bonus footage included on the VHS and DVD releases:

Punch You in the Eye (bonus track 1)
December 11, 1997 - Rochester War Memorial, Rochester, NY

Big Black Furry Creatures from Mars (bonus track 3)
December 11, 1997 - Rochester War Memorial, Rochester, NY

Dirt (bonus track 4, after Page interview)
December 11, 1997 - Rochester War Memorial, Rochester, NY

Maze (bonus track X)
December 11, 1997 - Rochester War Memorial, Rochester, NY

Home media
The film was released on DVD and VHS on March 6, 2001. Both formats feature extra footage, including uncut live performances of Punch You in the Eye, Maze, Big Black Furry Creature from Mars and Lawn Boy, as well as additional interview sequences that didn't make it into the film. The DVD edition also includes the original theatrical trailer and an interview with director Todd Phillips, and offers Dolby Digital 5.1 and DTS Surround Sound. The film is presented in its original 1.85:1 Theatrical Aspect Ratio however the DVD is not anamorphic.

Personnel
Phish
 Trey Anastasio - guitars, vocals
 Page McConnell - keyboards, vocals
 Mike Gordon - bass, vocals
 Jon Fishman - drums, vocals

External links

 Interview with Todd Phillips by Parke Puterburgh

Phish video albums
2000 video albums
Live video albums
2000 live albums
Phish live albums
Films directed by Todd Phillips